Margaritolobium is a monotypic genus of flowering plants in the legume family, Fabaceae. It belongs to the subfamily Faboideae. The sole species is Margaritolobium luteum.

References 

Millettieae
Monotypic Fabaceae genera